The Yarrawarrah Tigers Rugby League Football Club is a rugby league football club that is based in the Sydney suburb of Yarrawarrah and competes in the Cronulla-Sutherland District Rugby Football League.
The Yarrawarrah Tigers club currently field teams from the under 6 year age groups up to 17 year olds.

Notable players 
Notable First Grade Players that have played at Yarrawarrah Tigers include:
Keith Galloway (2003-17 Cronulla Sharks, Leeds Rhinos & Wests)
Reece Williams (2003-09 Cronulla Sharks)
Joel Reddy (2005-16 Parramatta Eels, Wests Tigers & South Sydney)
Chad Townsend (2011- Cronulla Sharks & New Zealand Warriors)
Stewart Mills (2011-13 Cronulla Sharks and Brisbane Broncos)
Michael Lichaa (2014- Cronulla Sharks & Canterbury Bulldogs)
Daniel Vasquez (2020- Cronulla Sharks)

See also

References

External links
LeagueNet Yarrawarrah Tigers website
Yarrawarrah Tigers Official Facebook page

Rugby clubs established in 1978
1978 establishments in Australia
Rugby league teams in Sydney